Uplink (also known in North America as Uplink: Hacker Elite) is a simulation video game released in 2001 by the British company Introversion Software. The player takes charge of a freelance computer hacker in a fictional futuristic 2010, and must break into foreign computers, complete contracts and purchase new hardware to hack into increasingly harder computer systems.

The game, which was Introversion's first release, was generally well received in Europe, and was released in North America by the publisher Strategy First as Uplink: Hacker Elite in 2003. Uplink was later ported to Android and iOS systems in 2012.

Plot 

In the game, the player assumes the role of a hacker in the year 2010, who begins work for the Uplink Corporation, which is a worldwide company providing work for hackers. The player amasses money, software, gateway hardware and skill in the course of performing jobs for various clients, and hacking servers of global corporations for profit.

The storyline of the game begins with the player receiving a delayed e-mail from a deceased top ranking Uplink agent concerning the research done by the Andromeda Research Corporation, related to the Andromeda organization a "Anti-capitalist, Techno-anarchist" group which proclaims the destruction of the Internet (however, this email can be cancelled by player). It is constructing a computer virus known as Revelation using artificial life research as a base in an attempt to destroy the Internet. One of the companies, Arunmor, attempts to cross their plans by developing Faith, a counter virus that can purge Revelation.

The player can choose to side with ARC or Arunmor or even ignore the plot in its entirety, concentrating on freelance hacking, in which case the storyline plays out without the player's participation.

During the missions Andromeda uses stolen information about "The Darwin Project," digital lifeforms that exist and reproduce on the internet and puts it into the Revelation virus. Thus allowing it to behave like a normal human virus allowing it to spread quickly. Numerous attacks on ARC and Arunmor systems also occur in the storyline. Including a mission leading the chief technical director of Arunmor being framed for bank fraud. The government is also said to be helping fund Arunmor's "faith" anti-virus and is looking to raid ARC and arrest people involved yet lack the evidence to do so before the launch of "Revelation."

After the Revelation virus is released, the final mission of the game begins, and the storylines play out. The Arunmor storyline ends with the destruction of Revelation, which leads to a federal raid of Andromeda and the subsequent arrest of suspected staff members in the company, along with a number of Uplink agents. The leader of Andromeda then issues a statement, making no apologies for releasing Revelation, as he argues that the internet became more of an extension of Western capitalism to serve the interest of elites, rather than to promote free speech and anonymity. He also says that people will never be safe on the web and that their lives are on file waiting to be tampered with. He goes on to state that people's lives are being destroyed by computer technology despite its perceived benefits. He is then sentenced to 8 years in prison. Andromeda then shuts down operations, while shares rise to a new high for Arunmor, as they release "Faith" to the public. It is also suggested the government is oblivious to the possible hacks available within Uplink. The ending of ARC's storyline ends with the destruction of the internet due to Revelation (including the player's gateway) and causes Uplink to cease operations.

Style 
Uplink focuses on emulating highly stylized, Hollywood-esque hacking, as seen in movies such as Hackers, Sneakers, WarGames and Swordfish. References to these movies can be found throughout the game, including joke servers for companies such as Steve Jackson Games (which has been raided by the Secret Service) and a nuclear missile control system from WarGames. It also features at least three references to the movie Sneakers, including one which can be found in the first version of the game (and was later removed in an update released by Introversion) which is a cheat code in which the user has to enter "TooManySecrets" (an anagram to the phrase "Setec Astronomy") as the username thus allowing them to access a cheat menu. Another reference to the anagram is the password "MySocratesNote", sent to the player in an e-mail which starts the plotline. In addition, the voice print sections use the phrase "Hello. I am the system administrator. My voice is my passport. Verify me." which is similar to the one Sneakers used.

 Most of the 'hacking' is of the form: "there is a security system of type X, level Y that is stopping me from accessing or changing something I need to access or change, so I need to have an anti-X program of level Y+". There is some need for rapid selection of programs to run, but there is no actual difficulty in running them (provided that one can afford them).

The game has a certain number of unusual features, including an in-game IRC client and in earlier versions a multi-monitor feature requiring another copy of the game running on a second computer. The latter was removed in later versions due to lack of stability and popularity and, as it was called "Network", was often confused with multiplayer gaming (that the game does not offer).

Soundtrack 
The game uses several songs originally made in S3M, mod and xm format. The original song files are included on the bonus CD-ROM of the game, a disc that was originally given as a free addition to those who referred the game to others. The disc also includes several songs which were not used in the final game.

 The Blue Valley by Karsten Koch
 Deep in Her Eyes by Peter 'Skaven' Hajba
 Mystique Parts 1 and 2 by Robert 'Timelord' Gergely 
 Symphonic by Simon 'Hollywood' Carless

Release 
Uplink was first released in October 2001, and was initially sold digitally and distributed by mail. The game was released for Microsoft Windows and Linux (2012) directly by Introversion, and ported to and released for Mac by Contraband and Ambrosia Software respectively. Chris Delay stated in an interview with PC Gamer UK that they did not pay for advertising of the game at all — it became known purely by word of mouth. A version released in the US was published and distributed by Strategy First under the title Uplink: Hacker Elite. Legal proceedings were undertaken when Strategy First filed for bankruptcy and ceased paying Introversion royalties, but the Hacker Elite version remains available from various sources. The game is now also available via Valve's Steam online distribution service, via GOG.com, as well as via the Ubuntu Software Center. Uplink was also released for iOS on 7 June 2012. An Android version debuted as part of The Humble Bundle for Android 3, on 15 August 2012.

Hacker Elite royalties 
A version released in the US was published and distributed by Strategy First under the title Uplink: Hacker Elite. Strategy First ran into financial difficulties, and ceased paying royalties to Introversion shortly before filing for bankruptcy protection, but continued to sell the game in competition with Introversion.

On 20 January 2006, Introversion announced they were taking legal action against all retailers of Uplink: Hacker Elite, except Stardock. It transpired that, while filing for bankruptcy would have caused a breach of contract, Strategy First persuaded Canadian courts to grant a moratorium preventing termination of the contract. Strategy First has resumed paying limited royalties.

Stores and services currently reselling Hacker Elite in North America include:
 Direct2Drive, IGN's digital distribution service (as of July 2006).
 Strategy First's online store.

As some versions of Uplink: Hacker Elite have been modified, many game mods and patches will not run with the Hacker Elite version.

Reception

The iOS and PC versions received "generally favorable reviews" according to the review aggregation website Metacritic.

The editors of Computer Gaming World presented Uplink: Hacker Elite with their 2003 "Adventure Game of the Year" award. They summarized it as "an immersive, original, and suspenseful little game."

References

External links 

Modlink — Modding website

2001 video games
Ambrosia Software games
Android (operating system) games
Cyberpunk video games
Hacking video games
Introversion Software games
IOS games
Linux games
MacOS games
Spy video games
Windows games
Video games developed in the United Kingdom
Video games set in 2010
Video games scored by Peter Hajba
Strategy First games
Single-player video games